Internet network operators' groups (NOGs) are informal, country-based, or regional groups that exist to provide forums for Internet network operators to discuss matters of mutual interest, usually through a combination of mailing lists and annual conferences. Although these groups have no formal power, their members are typically influential members of the Internet service provider (ISP), Internet exchange point (IXP), regional Internet registry (RIR), operational security community, Internet Protocol version 6 (IPv6) operations, Domain Name System (DNS) and root zone operations, and other network operations communities, and discussions within these groups are often influential in the overall process of ensuring the Internet remains operational, robust, secure, and stable. They also allow networking professionals and other members of the research and technical communities to update each other on their work, share news and updates, exchange best practices, discuss new technologies or protocols, teach and learn from each other, network with other members of the community, and discuss current network- and Internet-related issues and challenges.

List of Internet network operators' groups

Global Scope 
 GNA – Global NOG Alliance

Africa 
 Af-IX – African Community for IXPs
 AfNOG – Africa Network Operators' Group
 SAFNOG – Southern African Network Operators' Group 
 ZIMNOG – Zimbabwe Network Operators' Group 
 KZNNOG – Kwazulu Natal Network Operators' Group 
 AONOG  – Angola Network Operators' Group 
 cmNOG – Cameroonian Network Operators' Group 
 CGNOG  – Congo Network Operators' Group 
 ghNOG – Ghana Network Operators' Group 
 ngNOG – Nigerian Network Operators' Group 
 RWNOG  – Rwanda Network Operators' Group 
 SnNOG - Senegal Network Operations Group 
 SdNOG – Sudan Network Operators' Group 
 tzNOG  – Tanzania Network Operators' Group 
 SomNOG - Somalia Network Operators' Group 
 ugNOG - Uganda Network Operators' Group 
 MaliNOG – Malian Network Operators' Group 
 AFRINIC – African Network Information Centre
 AIS (African Internet Summit) & AFRINIC Regional Meetings – AFRINIC Service Region Meetings

The Americas

Latin America and the Caribbean 
 CaribNOG – Caribbean Network Operators' Group
 LAC-IX – Latin America & Caribbean Community for IXPs
 LACNOG – Latin American & Caribbean Region Network Operators' Group
 NOG Ecuador – Ecuador Network Operators' Group 
 ArNOG – Argentina Network Operators' Group 
 NOG Chile  – Chile Network Operators' Group 
 NOG Bolivia – Bolivia Network Operators' Group

Northern America 
 NANOG – North American Network Operators' Group
 CHI-NOG – Chicago Network Operators' Group 
 NYNOG – New York Network Operators' Group 
 MBNOG – Manitoba Network Operators' Group 
 MTLNOG – Montreal Network Operators' Group

Asia and Oceania

Asia-Pacific 
 PacNOG – The Pacific Network Operators' Group
 SANOG – South Asia Network Operators' Group
 AusNOG – Australia Network Operators' Group 
 BdNOG – Bangladesh Network Operators' Group 
 btNOG – Bhutan Network Operators' Group 
 CNNOG  – China Network Operators' Group 
 HKNOG – Hong Kong Network Operators' Group 
 INNOG – India Network Operators' Group 
 IDNOG – Indonesia Network Operators' Group 
 JANOG – Japan Network Operators' Group 
 LKNOG - Lanka Network Operators' Group 
 MyNOG – Malaysia Network Operators' Group 
 MMNOG  – Myanmar Network Operators' Group 
 MNNOG – Mongolian Network Operators' Group 
 NPNOG – Nepal Network Operators' Group 
 PANOG  – Pakistan Network Operators' Group 
 PHNOG – Philippines Network Operators' Group 
 SGNOG – Singapore Network Operators' Group 
 THNOG – Thailand Network Operators' Group 
 NZNOG – New Zealand Network Operators' Group 

Additional Asia-Pacific technical networking and peering communities

 APIX – The Asian Community for Internet Exchange Points
 APOPS – The Asia Pacific Operators Forum
 APRICOT – The Asia Pacific Regional Internet Conference on Operational Technologies
 APIAP – The Asia Pacific Internet Association
 APIPv6TF – The Asia Pacific IPv6 Task Force

Middle East 
 MENOG – Middle East Network Operators' Group

 IRNOG – Iranian Internet Network Operators' Group - (گروه گردانندگان شبکه اینترنت ایران - ایرناگ) 
 TRNOG – Turkish Network Operators' Group (Türkiye Network Operatörleri Grubu)

Europe 
 CSNOG – Czech and Slovak Network Operators Group 
 CEE Peering Days – Central and Eastern Europe (CEE) Peering Days
 ENOG – Eurasia Network Operators' Group (Russian Federation, CIS, and Eastern Europe) 
 European Internet Exchange Association – Euro-IX (the European community for IXPs)
 NORDNOG  – Nordic Network Operators' Group
 RIPE – Réseaux IP Européens Network
 SEE – South East Europe / RIPE NCC regional meeting
 ALNOG – Albanian Network Operators' Group 
 ATNOG – Austrian Network Operators' Group 
 BENOG – Belgium Network Operators' Group 
 NOG.BG – Bulgarian Network Operations' Group 
 DKNOG – Danish Network Operators' Group 
 ESNOG – Spanish Network Operators' Group 
 nog.fi – Network Operators' Group of Finland 
 FRnOG – France Network Operators' Group 
 DENOG – German Network Operators' Group 
 GRnOG – Greece Network Operators' Group 
 GTER – Spain Network Operators' Group (Grupo de Operadores de Red Españoles, ESNOG) 
 ITNOG – Italian Network Operators' Group 
 iNOG – Ireland Network Operators' Group 
 LINX 
 NLNOG – Netherlands Network Operators' Group 
 NONOG – Norwegian Network Operators' Group 
 PLNOG – Polish Network Operators' Group 
 PTNOG – Portuguese Network Operators' Group 
 RSNOG – Republic of Serbia Network Operators' Group 
 RONOG – Romania Network Operators' Group 
 SINOG – Slovenia Network Operators' Group 
 SOF – Swedish Operators' Forum 
 SwiNOG – Swiss Network Operators' Group 
 HRNOG – Croatian Network Operators' Group 
 UANOG – Ukraine Network Operators' Group 
 UKNOF – United Kingdom Network Operators' Forum

Additional links
 The Asia-Pacific Network Information Centre's (APNIC) list of NOGs in the Asia-Pacific region
 Bugest NOG list
 The Internet Society's (ISOC) development activities
 List of Internet exchange points
 The Network Startup Resource Center's Network Education and Training Calendar of Events, listing NOGs and their meeting dates
 NOG meeting dates and related Internet events
 RIPE NCC's NOG resource page
 Senki NOG list

See also
 Regional Internet registry
 Internet exchange point

Network Operators' Groups

Footnotes

References